The 2016 Volta a Portugal is a men's road bicycle race held from 27 July to 7 August 2016. It is the 78th edition of the men's stage race to be held, which was established in 1927. As part of the 2016 UCI Europe Tour, it is rated as a 2.1 event.

Participating teams
In total, 18 teams are set to compete.

National teams:

International teams:

Schedule

Classification leadership

Classification standings

Prologue
27 July 2016 — Oliveira de Azeméis, 3.2 km individual time trial (ITT)

Prologue result and general classification

Stage 1
28 July 2016 — Ovar (Furadouro) to Braga, 167.4 km

Stage 2
19 July 2016 — Viana do Castelo to Fafe, 160 km

Stage 3
30 July 2016 — Montalegre to Macedo de Cavaleiros, 158.9 km

Stage 4
31 July 2016 — Bragança to Mondim de Basto (Srª da Graça), 191.9 km

Stage 5
1 August 2016 — Lamego to Viseu, 153.2 km

Stage 6
3 August 2016 — Belmonte to Guarda, 173.7 km

Stage 7
4 August 2016 — Figueira de Castelo Rodrigo to Castelo Branco, 182 km

Stage 8
5 August 2016 — Nazaré to Arruda dos Vinhos, 208.5 km

Stage 9
6 August 2016 — Alcácer do Sal to Setúbal, 187.5 km

Stage 10
7 August 2016 — ITT Vila Franca de Xira to Lisbon, 32 km

Final standings

References

External links

2016
Volta a Portugal
Volta a Portugal